Gillett's lark (Mirafra gilletti) or Gillett's bushlark is a species of lark in the family Alaudidae found in eastern Africa.

Taxonomy and systematics

Subspecies
Three subspecies are recognized: 
 M. g. gilletti - Sharpe, 1895: Found in eastern Ethiopia and northwestern Somalia
 Degodi lark (M. g. degodiensis) - Érard, 1976: Originally described as a separate species. Found in southeastern Ethiopia 
 M. g. arorihensis - Érard, 1976: Found in central Somalia to northeastern Kenya

Distribution and habitat
Mirafra gilletti has a somewhat wide range, with an estimated global extent of occurrence of 690,000 km2 over Ethiopia, Kenya, and Somalia.

Its natural habitats are dry savannah and subtropical or tropical dry shrubland.

References

Gillett's lark
Birds of the Horn of Africa
Gillett's lark
Taxonomy articles created by Polbot
Taxobox binomials not recognized by IUCN